Art Hampson (born March 27, 1947) is a retired ice hockey player that was drafted by the Chicago Black Hawks in the 1st round with the 5th overall pick of the 1963 NHL Draft. Even though he was drafted, he never played a game in the National Hockey League .

Career statistics

External links

1947 births
Living people
Chicago Blackhawks draft picks
Ice hockey people from Ontario
National Hockey League first-round draft picks
Oshawa Generals players
Sportspeople from Kirkland Lake
Canadian ice hockey defencemen